The 19th Lancers is an armoured regiment of the Pakistan Army. Before 1956, it was known as 19th King George V's Own Lancers, which was a regular cavalry regiment of the British Indian Army. It was formed  in 1922, by the amalgamation of 18th King George's Own Lancers and 19th Lancers (Fane's Horse). On Partition of India in 1947, the regiment was allotted to Pakistan.

18th King George's Own Lancers
The regiment was raised at Gwalior during the upheaval of the Indian Mutiny in 1858, as the 2nd Regiment of Mahratta Horse. In December, it was joined by a small body of independent cavalry of Punjabi Rajput Muslims called the  Tiwana Horse. In 1861, it was redesignated as the 18th Regiment of Bengal Cavalry, becoming Lancers in 1886. The regiment served in the Second Afghan War during 1879–80 and took part in the 1897 Tirah Campaign on the North West Frontier of India.

During World War I, the regiment was sent to France in 1914 with the Indian Cavalry Corps and participated in the Battles of the Somme and Cambrai. In 1918, it moved to Egypt joining the 13th Cavalry Brigade and took part in General Edmund Allenby's campaign in Palestine. The regiment fought in the Battle of Megiddo and the subsequent dash towards Damascus – riding 550 miles in 38 days.
 1861: 18th Regiment of Bengal Cavalry
 1886: 18th Regiment of Bengal Lancers
 1901: 18th Bengal Lancers
 1906: 18th Prince of Wales's Own Tiwana Lancers
 1910: 18th King George's Own Lancers

19th Lancers (Fane's Horse)

The regiment was raised as the Fane's Horse by Captain Walter Fane at Cawnpore in 1860 for service in the Second Opium War. In China, the regiment fought in several sharp actions including those at Sinho, Chan-chi-wan and Pa-le-chiao. It then took part in the capture of Chinese capital of Pekin (Beijing). In 1861, the regiment was redesignated as the 19th Regiment of Bengal Cavalry, becoming Lancers in 1864. It served in the Second Afghan War and fought in the Battle of Ahmad Khel in 1880. During World War I, the regiment served in France in the 2nd (Sialkot) Cavalry Brigade and participated in the Battles of the Somme and Cambrai. In 1918, it took part in the Palestinian Campaign and fought with distinction in the Battle of Megiddo.
 1861: 19th Regiment of Bengal Cavalry
 1864: 19th Regiment of Bengal Cavalry (Lancers)
 1874: 19th Regiment of Bengal Lancers
 1901: 19th Bengal Lancers
 1903: 19th Lancers (Fane's Horse)

19th King George V's Own Lancers

After the First World War, the number of Indian cavalry regiments was reduced from thirty-nine to twenty-one. However, instead of disbanding the surplus units, it was decided to amalgamate them in pairs. This resulted in renumbering and renaming of the entire cavalry line. The 18th King George's Own Lancers and 19th Lancers (Fane's Horse) were merged to form the 18th/19th Cavalry. In 1923, the regiment was redesignated as the 19th King George's Own Lancers, and in 1937 as 19th King George V's Own Lancers. Their uniform was scarlet with white facings and blue overalls. The badge consisted of crossed lances with the cypher of King George V at the intersection, a crown above, and the title scroll below. The new class composition of the regiment was one squadron each of Punjabi Muslims, Sikhs and Hindu Jats.

During the Second World War, the 19th KGVO Lancers was the divisional Reconnaissance Regiment of 25th Indian Infantry Division and fought in the Third Arakan Campaign in Burma. In November 1944, the 25th Indian Division cleared the Mayu Range down to Foul Point and occupied Akyab Island. These actions included the decisive Battle of Kangaw and landings at Myebon and Ru-Ywa to intercept the retreating Japanese. The regiment was actively engaged in these battles. In May, a squadron of 19th KGVO Lancers took part in the seaborne assault landing near Rangoon, which led to the capture of the Burmese capital. In April 1945 the 25th Indian Division was withdrawn to South India to prepare for the invasion of Malaya. Although Japan surrendered in August, the operation proceeded as planned and the 25th Division along with 19th KGVO Lancers was the first formation to land in Malaya. It then proceeded to occupy the capital Kuala Lumpur and accepted the surrender of the Japanese Army.

In 1947, with the partitioning of the British Indian empire and the creation of a separate state of Pakistan, the 19th King George V's Own Lancers was transferred to the Pakistan Army. The regiment exchanged its Jat squadron with the Central India Horse for its Punjabi Mussalman squadron, and gave its Sikh squadron to Skinner's Horse in return for its Mussalman squadron.

19th Lancers
In 1956, when Pakistan became a republic, all references to the British royalty were dropped and the regiment became simply the 19th Lancers. During the 1965 Indo-Pakistan War, the regiment had the unique distinction of serving in four theatres of war. Its Recce Troop served with 12 Division in Operation Grand Slam, while the rest of the regiment was deployed near Kasur as part of 1 Armoured Division. From Kasur, it was later sent to Lahore Sector and then finally to Chawinda as part of 6 Armoured Division. It was here, that 19th Lancers finally got a chance to go into action. The regiment saw heavy fighting and played an important role in blunting the Indian offensive.

In 1993–94, the regiment was deployed in Mogadishu, Somalia, as part of United Nations Peacekeeping Forces (UNOSOM II). The regiment's performance was highly commendable and it played a key role in rescuing the American Rangers, who were trapped by Somali gunmen after the disastrous American operation on 3 and 4 October 1993.

Battle honours
Battle of Taku Forts (1860), Pekin 1860, Ahmad Khel, Afghanistan 1878–80, Tirah, Punjab Frontier, Somme 1916, Bazentin, Flers-Courcelette, Morval, Cambrai 1917, France and Flanders 1914–18, Megiddo, Sharon, Damascus, Palestine 1918, Buthidaung, Mayu Valley, Myebon, Kangaw, Ru-Ywa, Dalet, Tamandu, Rangoon Road, Burma 1942–45, Chawinda 1965, Lower Dir and Swat (2017-2019).

Affiliations & Alliances
  7th Battalion The Frontier Force Regiment
 The Light Dragoons
 2nd Battalion The Grenadier Guards

References

Further reading
 Ahmad, Lt Col RN. (2011). Battle Honours of 19th Lancers. Rawalpindi: The Author.
 Hudson, Havelock. (1937). History of the 19th King George's Own Lancers, 1858–1921. Aldershot: Gale & Polden.
 Pocock, Brig JG. (1962). The Spirit of a Regiment: Being the History of 19th King George V’s Own Lancers 1921–1947. Aldershot: Gale & Polden.
 19th King George V's Own Lancers: War News, September 1939 – December 1945.
 Gaylor, John. (1992). Sons of John Company: The Indian and Pakistan Armies 1903–91.  Stroud: Spellmount. .
 Harris, RG, and Warner, C. (1979). Bengal Cavalry Regiments 1857–1914. London: Osprey Publishing. .
 Cardew, Lt FG. (1903). A Sketch of the Services of the Bengal Native Army to the Year 1895. Calcutta: Military Department.
 Elliott, Maj Gen JG. (1968). The Frontier 1839–1947: The Story of the North-West Frontier of India. London: Cassell.
 Kempton, C. (1996). A Register of Titles of the Units of the H.E.I.C. & Indian Armies 1666–1947. Bristol: British Empire & Commonwealth Museum. 
 Kirby, Maj Gen S Woodburn. (1965). The War against Japan, volume 4 (The Reconquest of Burma). London: HMSO.
 Lucas, Sir Charles. (1926). The Empire at War, volume 5. London: Oxford University Press.
 Maxwell, Leigh. (1979). My God – Maiwand! Operations of the South Afghanistan Field Force 1878–80. London: Leo Cooper.
 Swinson, Arthur. (1969). North-West Frontier. London: Corgi.
 Trench, CC. (1988). The Indian Army and the King’s Enemies, 1900–1947. London: Thames and Hudson.
 Husain, Maj Gen Abrar. (2005). Men of Steel: 6 Armoured Division in the 1965 War. War Despatches of Major General Abrar Husain. Rawalpindi: Army Education Publishing House.
 Ahmed, Lt Gen Mahmud. (2006). History of Indo-Pak War – 1965. Rawalpindi: Services Book Club.

Armoured regiments of Pakistan
British Indian Army cavalry regiments
Military units and formations established in 1858
1858 establishments in India
R